Abitha is an Indian film and television actress who appears in Tamil language films and teleserials. She appeared in notable productions including Sethu alongside Vikram. She is famous for her role as Archana in the teleserial Thirumathi Selvam, which aired from 2007 to 2013 in Sun TV starring opposite Sanjeev. She was the winner of Sun Kudumbam Viruthugal for Best Actress twice  by Sun Kudumbam Viruthugal for Thirumathi Selvam in the years 2010 and 2012.

Career
As a teenager, Abitha used to go and see the television serial, Nancy starring Sanghavi, being filmed near her house in Thiruvottiyur. The director of that serial recognised her and spoke to her parents, roping her in to play the heroine's sister in their next TV serial Criminal. After doing a couple of serials, she did a low-budget film titled Golmaal as the sister of the lead lady and then B-Grade film titled Devadasi in Malayalam. At that time, director Bala roped her in for a leading role in Sethu alongside Vikram, which she signed after Keerthi Reddy and Rajshri had dropped out. Bala renamed her Abitha from her original name of Jenila for the film, after the character she was portraying. The film opened in December 1999 at a single noon show at a suburban theatre but built up through word-of-mouth publicity and ran for over one hundred days at several cinema halls across Chennai, becoming a critical and commercial success. Sethu won the National Film Award for Best Feature Film in Tamil and secured wins in the Best Film category at the Filmfare Awards and the Cinema Express Awards, while Abitha won critical acclaim for her role of a timil Brahmin girl. After Sethus success, Abitha was flooded with offers but chose to complete her studies and finish her PG in Sociology from Annamalai University. She revealed that by the time she decided to come back she had lost her contacts in the industry and was thereafter seen in only a couple of insignificant projects.

She appeared alongside veteran actor Ramarajan in Seerivarum Kaalai before starring in Poove Pen Poove alongside newcomer Ishaq Husseini. After the failure of those films she played the role of Arjun's sister in Arasatchi. Other films in the period, such as Pirantha Naal with Prakash Raj, Kashmir with Abhinay and Kandhavel with Murali were not completed and indefinitely shelved. In 2005, she got another breakthrough and signed on to play the lead role in Kannamma scripted by Karunanidhi, but to do so she unceremoniously opted out of another film titled Ullakadathal. Subsequently, the producers of that film complained and got her banned by the Producer's Council, leaving her out of both films. Later that year she featured in Unarchigal alongside Abbas and Kunal. Her next film was Suyetchai MLA, which had a delayed release in 2006, and featured her opposite Sathyaraj and she was last seen in Nam Naadu as the wife of Saranraj.

Abitha made her small screen debut as the main lead actress in Thirumathi Selvam in 2007 in which she starred opposite Sanjeev. The show made them establish as one of the most celebrated pair of small screen and made them enjoy immense popularity among Tamil audience for their characters Selvam  and Archana in the show. The show was a Superhit ruling the Tamil small screen for 4 and half years from 2008 to 2013. Abitha was selected the best actress of Sun TV in the first two editions of Sun Kudumbam awards held in the years 2010 and 2012 for her performance as Archana in the show. She also starred in the low profile serial Thangamana Purushan. She got married in 2009 and continued to work in serials following her marriage.

Filmography

Television

References

External links 
 

Actresses in Tamil cinema
Living people
Indian film actresses
Actresses in Malayalam cinema
20th-century Indian actresses
21st-century Indian actresses
Indian television actresses
Actresses in Malayalam television
Actresses in Kannada cinema
Actresses in Tamil television
1985 births